A foot of fine (plural, feet of fines; Latin: pes finis; plural, pedes finium) is the archival copy of the agreement between two parties in an English lawsuit over land, most commonly the fictitious suit (in reality a conveyance) known as a fine of lands or final concord. The procedure was followed from c.1195 until 1833, and the considerable body of resulting records is now held at The National Archives, Kew, London.

History
In the reign of Henry II of England, the royal justices first began the practice of registering the settlement of disagreements over land by having both parties bring a suit before the royal courts. The resulting decision was thus given royal sanction.

At first, two copies of the agreement ("fine") were made, created as chirographs: i.e. the text was written in duplicate on a single piece of parchment, which was then cut in half, one copy going to each of the litigants. Under Hubert Walter's justiciarship, probably about 1195, the practice was started of writing the text in triplicate, so that a third copy could be filed in the Treasury. This copy of the text was written at the foot of the piece of parchment, and so became known as the "foot of the fine", or simply "foot of fine".

The first recorded foot of fine is endorsed with the statement "This is the first chirograph that was made in the king's court in the form of three chirographs, according to the command of his lordship of Canterbury and other barons of the king, to the end that by this form a record can be made to be passed on to the treasurer to put in the treasury." The agreement concerns Walter's brother Theobald, who was the plaintiff.

Within a few years, the practice of recording feet of fines had spread widely, and even to Scotland, as in 1198 an agreement between William de Bruce of Annandale and Adam of Carlisle over eight ploughgates in Lockerbie, Scotland was filed with the English treasury, recorded with those from Northumberland. While early fines could be made in the Exchequer, after the early 14th century, fines were always made in the Court of Common Pleas.

The practice survived until fines were abolished by the Fines and Recoveries Act of 1833.

Diagrammatic representation

Publication
Many feet of fines have been published by antiquarian, text publication and other societies.

General
 [covering Bedfordshire, Berkshire, Buckinghamshire, Cambridgeshire and Cornwall to 1214]
 [covering Cumberland, Derbyshire, Devon and Dorset to 1214]

County
Bedfordshire

Buckinghamshire

Cambridgeshire

Cornwall
 (2 vols.)
Cumberland
Transactions of the Cumberland and Westmorland Antiquarian and Archaeological Society, 7

Derbyshire
Transactions of the Derbyshire Archaeological Society (1885–1896)

Devon
 (2 vols.)
Dorset

Essex

Gloucestershire

Kent

Lincolnshire

Norfolk and Suffolk

Somerset

Staffordshire

Surrey

Sussex
 (3 vols.: part I, 2 Richard I–33 Henry III [1190–1249]; part II, 34 Henry III–35 Edward I [1249–1307]; part III, 1 Edward II–24 Henry VII [1307–1509])
Wiltshire

Yorkshire

Notes

Further reading

External links
Land conveyances by feet of fines 1182–1833 (The National Archives)
British History Online (University of London)

Medieval English law
Documents
Collection of The National Archives (United Kingdom)
English legal terminology